The 1921 Goodall Cup Final was the first Goodall Cup series after the end of the First World War.

The series

Game one
25 July 1921 With three players out of the line up due to influenza, Victoria quickly fell to New South Wales with only 1 goal to their 6.

Game two
27 July 1921 the second game of the series was easily won by New South Wales, defeating Victoria by a score of 7-2.

Game three 
30 July 1921 New South Wales swept the visiting team Victoria in the interstate series by winning the 3rd and final game by a score of 3-1 in front of 2000 spectators. Victoria would score in the second half of the game but New South Wales returned by scoring 3 more to defeat Victoria for the third straight game by a score of 6-1.

Teams

Victoria
The Victoria team was made from the following players
 Gordon Langridge (Captain)
 John Edwin Goodall (Vice Captain)
 R. Marks
 Andrew Reid
 Mitch Harris
 Ray Alexander
 Ted Molonoy
 W. Watkins
 Victor Langsford
 L. W. Roche 
 Cliff Webster (Goaltender)

New South Wales
The New South Wales team was made from the following players
 Jack Pike (Captain)
 Leslie Reid (Vice Captain)
 Jim Kendall 
 T. Gibson
 K. Poulton
 H. Ive
 C. Gates
 J. Lowick
 C. Kerr (Goaltender)

Goal Umpires
J. Duff and T. Reynolds

Player statistics

Leading goaltenders
The following goaltenders led the interstate championship for goals against average.

See also

 Goodall Cup
 Ice Hockey Australia
Australian Ice Hockey League

References

Goodall Cup
1921 in Australian sport
1921 in ice hockey
Sports competitions in Sydney
1920s in Sydney